Tullyvallen Rangers Football Club is an intermediate-level football club playing in the Intermediate B division of the Mid-Ulster Football League in Northern Ireland. They play all home games at the recently opened Hillview Park at Tullyvallen outside Newtownhamilton.The ground was officially opened by  Linfield manager David Healy during a pre season friendly in 2016.

References

Mid-Ulster Football League